Crossing the Bridge: The Sound of Istanbul is a 2005 documentary film directed by Fatih Akın. The film is a journey through the music scene in modern Istanbul, Turkey as well as portraying its cultural life. It was screened out of competition at the 2005 Cannes Film Festival.

It features German musician Alexander Hacke (member of Einstürzende Neubauten) as the narrator. Hacke and Akın travelled around Istanbul with a mobile recording studio and a microphone, assembling an inspired portrait of Turkish music — from arabesque to indie rock and rap.

Among the featured artists in the film are (in order of appearance):

Baba Zula
Orient Expressions
Duman
Replikas
Erkin Koray
Ceza
Ayben
Istanbul Style Breakers
Mercan Dede
Selcuk
Brenna MacCrimmon
Selim Sesler
Siyasiyabend
Nur Ceylan
Aynur (i.e. Aynur Doğan)
Orhan Gencebay
Müzeyyen Senar
Sezen Aksu
Sertab Erener

Soundtrack
"Music" - Sertab Erener (5:18)
"Tavus Havası" - Baba Zula (5:27)
"İstanbul 1:26 A.M." - Orient Expressions (6:36)
"İstanbul" - Duman (1:40)
"Şahar Dağı" - Replikas (7:08)
"Holocaust" - Ceza (3:28)
"AB-I Hayat" - Mercan Dede (3:47)
"Kürdili Hicazkar Longa" - Selim Sesler (4:58)
"Wedding Song" - The Wedding Sound System (2:04)
"Penceresi Yola Karşı" - Selim Sesler & Brenna MacCrimmon (2:54)
"Hayyam" - Siya Siyabend (2:49)
"Böyle Olur Mu" - Nur Ceylan (1:34)
"Ehmedo" - Aynur Doğan (5:26)
"Hatasız Kul Olmaz" - Orhan Gencebay (5:24)
"Haydar Haydar" - Müzeyyen Senar (1:19)
"İstanbul Hatırası" - Sezen Aksu (4:38)
"Cecom" - Baba Zula (4:35)
"Music (Radyo Versyonu)" - Sertab Erener (3:47)

References

External links

2005 films
Films set in Istanbul
Films set in Turkey
Films directed by Fatih Akin
Documentary films about music and musicians
German documentary films
2000s German-language films
2000s Turkish-language films
Turkish documentary films
2005 documentary films
Turkish music
Culture in Istanbul
2005 multilingual films
German multilingual films
Turkish multilingual films
2000s German films